Lawrence Joseph Sarsfield Daly (January 22, 1912 – April 17, 1978), a.k.a. Lar "America First" Daly, was a fringe American politician who ran unsuccessfully for a variety of political offices (including President of the United States), often campaigning wearing an Uncle Sam suit.

Daly was a Republican primary candidate for Governor of Illinois in both 1956 and 1964. He was also a primary candidate for Mayor of Chicago in 1959, for both the Democratic and Republican parties, and also ran in the Republican primary in the 1963 and 1967 Chicago mayoral elections. He was the "Tax Cut" and "America First" candidate in the 1960 elections for President of the United States. He stood in primaries for United States Senator from Illinois, as a Democrat in 1962 and as a Republican in 1966, 1970, 1974, and 1978. He also ran for United States Representative from Illinois, in a special election in the 7th District in 1973, as a Republican.

Lar Daly is best known today for using the Federal Communications Commission's "Equal Time Rule" to force radio and television news broadcasts to give him equal coverage with John F. Kennedy and Richard M. Nixon during the 1960 Presidential campaign (which led to a particularly bizarre appearance on NBC's Tonight Starring Jack Paar) and later with Chicago Mayor Richard J. Daley during the Chicago mayoral campaigns.

He died at Little Company of Mary Hospital in Evergreen Park, Illinois on April 17, 1978. He was buried at Holy Sepulchre Cemetery in Alsip.

References

Candidates in the 1960 United States presidential election
20th-century American politicians
1912 births
1978 deaths
Burials at Holy Sepulchre Cemetery (Alsip, Illinois)